Frank Roland Ragland (May 26, 1904 – July 28, 1959) was a professional baseball player.  

He was a right-handed pitcher over parts of two seasons (1932–1933) with the Washington Senators and Philadelphia Phillies.  

For his career, he compiled a 1–4 record, with a 7.11 earned run average, and 15 strikeouts in 76 innings pitched.

He was born in Water Valley, Mississippi and died in Paris, Mississippi at the age of 55.

External links

1904 births
1959 deaths
Washington Senators (1901–1960) players
Philadelphia Phillies players
Major League Baseball pitchers
Baseball players from Mississippi
People from Water Valley, Mississippi
Tulsa Oilers (baseball) players
Chattanooga Lookouts players
Birmingham Barons players
Albany Senators players
New Orleans Pelicans (baseball) players
Portland Beavers players
Seattle Indians players
Rock Island Islanders players
Elmira Pioneers players
Jackson Senators players
Newton-Conover Twins players